Nenad Nenadović (20 October 1964 – 22 September 2021) was a Serbian film, television, voice and stage actor and television host.

Life and career
Born in Belgrade, he was a notable member of Boško Buha Theatre from 1987. As of February 2019, he played 3,100 plays in Boško Buha Theatre which makes him record holder. During his career, he had about 50 film and TV roles. He hosted a large number of TV shows including ones for children. He gave voice to Goku in Serbian version of Dragon Ball.

Nenadović died from COVID-19 on 22 September 2021, at the age of 56.

Filmography

References

External links 
 

1964 births
2021 deaths
Male actors from Belgrade
Serbian male actors
Serbian film actors
Serbian television actors
Serbian stage actors
Serbian male voice actors
Serbian television presenters
Deaths from the COVID-19 pandemic in Serbia
Burials at Belgrade New Cemetery